This is the April–June part of the 2010 ITF Women's Circuit.

Key

April

May

June

See also 
 2010 ITF Women's Circuit
 2010 ITF Women's Circuit (January–March)
 2010 ITF Women's Circuit (July–September)
 2010 ITF Women's Circuit (October–December)
 2010 WTA Tour

 04-06